The Nhabe Regional Football Association Division One League, also known as the NRFA Division One, is one of the regional leagues that make up the third tier of Botswana football. It is administered by the Nhabe Regional Football Association and features teams from in and around Maun. Sankoyo Bush Bucks is the only team in the league's history to play in the Botswana Premier League

Past seasons

References

Football leagues in Botswana